Paul Varghese (born January 4, 1977 in Dallas, Texas) is an American comedian and actor of Indian descent who appeared on the hit reality show Last Comic Standing 2, where he made it to the semi-finals. He taped his first full set for national television on March 8, 2007, for Comedy Central's Live at Gotham which aired July 13, 2007. He was a regular on the Pugs and Kelly radio show, noon-3 p.m. weekdays on Live 105.3/Free FM in Dallas when that radio station and show was still on the air.

Varghese is Indian American, the son of Malayali immigrant parents from Kerala, and grew up in Garland, Texas, a suburb of Dallas. He earned a bachelor's degree in radio, television and film from the University of North Texas in 2000. He spent his junior year of college at William Paterson University of New Jersey, during which he interned on Sally Jessy Raphael's talk show. His sister Winnie Varghese is the rector of St. Mark's Church in-the-Bowery, an Episcopal parish in New York City.

Varghese, who began doing stand-up in 2001, opened for Canadian-born comedian Russell Peters in a short theater tour through Los Angeles, San Francisco, Boston and New York in 2005. That led to his headlining a 16-city Gurus of Comedy tour in the spring of 2006. In 2007 he was named "Best Stand-Up Comic in Dallas" by the Dallas Observer and won the 2009 "Funniest Comic in Texas" competition. Varghese was also featured on Showtime's "Russell Peter's Presents",  Telemundo 2's "Loco Comedy Jam", Comedy Central's "Live at Gotham" and "Gabriel Iglesias Presents Stand-Up Revolution". On June 18, 2012, Varghese was given the opportunity to open for comedian Dave Chappelle at the Dallas House of Blues and the following night in Austin at the Paramount Theatre. On May 31, 2014, Varghese opened for Joan Rivers at IP Casino Resort in Biloxi, Mississippi. This was followed by several more openings for Ms. Rivers in June 2014.

References

External
official website
Myspace page
Review and biopic
Interview
Dallas news article
Mentions an upcoming series on the International channel
Google video of routine
Ego Magazine article: The Gurus of Comedy

American male actors of Indian descent
American people of Malayali descent
1977 births
Living people
American stand-up comedians
Male actors from Dallas
21st-century American comedians
Stand Up! Records artists